Jean Capelle (died 29 December 1962) was a French athlete. He competed in the men's marathon at the 1912 Summer Olympics.

References

External links
 

Year of birth missing
Place of birth missing
1962 deaths
Place of death missing
Athletes (track and field) at the 1912 Summer Olympics
French male marathon runners
Olympic athletes of France